Riverside High School is a government co-educational comprehensive secondary school located in , a suburb of , Tasmania, Australia. Established in 1962, the school caters for approximately 820 students from Years 7 to 10. The school is administered by the Tasmanian Department of Education.

In 2019 student enrolments were 754. The school principal is Natalie Odgers.

History 
In May 2008, Riverside science teacher William Briginshaw was awarded Tasmania's Winifred Curtis Medal for his contributions to science education.

In 2019 Riverside High received an extensive $12 million dollar redevelopment which was officially opened in November 2020 by Jeremy Rockliff, Minister for Education and Training, and Tim Bullard, Secretary of Education.

The Scott-Kilvert Hut in Cradle Mountain Lake St Clair National Park, Tasmania is a memorial hut dedicated to the lives of Ewen Scott and David Kilvert, a teacher and student from Riverside High School, who died due to a blizzard whilst bushwalking in 1965.

Notable alumni 

 Rene Hidding, former Minister in the Parliament of Tasmania
 Anthony Limbrick, Australian soccer manager
 Rachael Taylor, Australian actress
 Dylan Yeandle, Australian actor
 Dylan Hesp, Australian actor

See also 
 Education in Tasmania
 List of schools in Tasmania

References

External links
 

Public high schools in Tasmania
Schools in Launceston, Tasmania
Educational institutions established in 1962
1962 establishments in Australia